Distorsio smithi, common name Smith's distorsio, is a species of medium-sized sea snail, a marine gastropod mollusk in the family Personidae, the Distortio snails.

Description
The size of the shell varies between 40 mm and 112 mm.

Distribution
This species occurs in the Atlantic Ocean off the Cape Verdes, Mauritania, Gabon and Angola.

References

 Rolán E., 2005. Malacological Fauna From The Cape Verde Archipelago. Part 1, Polyplacophora and Gastropoda

External links
 

Personidae
Gastropods described in 1884
Molluscs of the Atlantic Ocean
Molluscs of Angola
Invertebrates of Gabon
Gastropods of Cape Verde